D. W. Poppy Secondary is a public high school in the Township of Langley, British Columbia, Canada, and is part of School District 35 Langley. It serves much of rural Langley Township, including western portions of Aldergrove.

History
The school opened in 1973 as D. W. Poppy Junior Secondary (grades 8 to 10), with the students remaining on shift at Langley Secondary for the first year. David Watkins was the first principal, holding that position for four years. The first vice principal was Wally Eggert. There were approximately 600 students enrolled with the grade 10 students feeding into Langley Secondary or Aldergrove Secondary for their senior years. In 1975 Graham Leask became vice principal, and in 1977 he became principal with Kiyo Hamade as vice principal.

In the first years of the school, the administration experimented with the quarter system, but presently the school is on the semester system of classes.

D. W. Poppy Secondary is situated on just over thirteen acres of land in a still-rural area of Langley. It is built of pre-cast concrete with aluminium windows. It is served by a drilled well (230 feet deep) and a septic tank system for sewage. It has five tennis courts, a floor hockey court, a basketball court, a rock dust jogging track, and three playing fields.

In 1980 the school added a grade 11 class, and in 1982 the first graduating class, with 115 members, finished grade 12. With the change from a junior to a senior school came a doubling in the size of the structure, with the addition of senior science laboratories and other classrooms. By 1983 the school had 930 students.

D.W. Poppy was one of a trio of Langley schools built from the same, or similar plans - designed to accommodate expansion. The others were R.E. Mountain Secondary School and Brookswood Secondary. After extensive renovations at all three schools, they are hardly recognizable as having evolved from the same plan. Brookswood (currently the largest of the three) and Poppy have both completed their courtyard enclosure, while Mountain remains closest to its original form.

Notable alumni
 Michael Roberds (1964–2016) was a Canadian Actor.
 Brad Jalbert (1965- ) is an internationally recognized rose breeder.
 Craig Redmond (1965-  ) is a retired professional ice hockey player.

References

High schools in British Columbia
School District 35 Langley
Educational institutions in Canada with year of establishment missing